The 2007 SuperLiga, the inaugural edition of the SuperLiga competition, was held from July 24 to August 29, 2007.  The eight clubs participating in the 2007 tournament were chosen by invitation.

All games of the tournament were carried live on Fox Sports World in Canada (English), Telefutura in the United States (Spanish), and Televisa and TV Azteca in Mexico (both Spanish).

Qualification
The eight teams in the inaugural 2007 edition were selected on an invitation-only basis.

From  Major League Soccer
 D.C. United
 FC Dallas
 Houston Dynamo
 Los Angeles Galaxy

From  Primera División de México
 CA Morelia
 CF Pachuca
 Club América
 CD Guadalajara

Group stage
There were two groups of four teams. Each group contained two clubs from each league with the top two teams from each groups advancing to the semifinals.

Group A

Group B

Knockout stage

Bracket

Semi-finals

Final

Goalscorers
4 goals
 Landon Donovan ( Los Angeles Galaxy)
3 goals
 Arturo Alvarez ( FC Dallas)
 Alan Gordon ( Los Angeles Galaxy)
2 goals

 Chris Klein ( Los Angeles Galaxy)
 Rafael Márquez Lugo ( Pachuca)
 Carlos Ruiz ( FC Dallas)

1 goal

 Marcio Antonio Batista ( Morelia)
 David Beckham ( Los Angeles Galaxy)
 Omar Bravo ( Guadalajara)
 Salvador Cabañas ( América)
 Juan Carlos Cacho ( Pachuca)
 Brian Ching ( Houston Dynamo)
 Andrés Chitiva ( Pachuca)
 Gonzalo Choy ( Morelia)
 Dwayne De Rosario ( Houston Dynamo)
 Rod Dyachenko ( D.C. United)
 Christian Giménez ( Pachuca)
 Christian Gómez ( D.C. United)
 Kevin Harmse ( Los Angeles Galaxy)
 Federico Insúa ( América)
 Nate Jaqua ( Houston Dynamo)
 Luis Ángel Landín ( Morelia)
 Diego Martínez ( Morelia)
 Juan Carlos Mosqueda ( América)
 Joseph Ngwenya ( Houston Dynamo)
 José Antonio Olvera ( Guadalajara)
 Carlos Pavón ( Los Angeles Galaxy)
 Eddie Robinson ( Houston Dynamo)
 Francisco Javier Rodríguez ( Guadalajara)
 Abe Thompson ( FC Dallas)
 Juan Toja ( FC Dallas)

References

External links
 Official Website

2007
North
North